The 2013–14 Duke Blue Devils women's basketball team represented Duke University during the 2013–14 NCAA Division I women's basketball season. Returning as head coach is Joanne P. McCallie entering her 7th season. The team plays its home games at Cameron Indoor Stadium in Durham, North Carolina as members of the Atlantic Coast Conference.

Previous season
Duke came off a 33-3 overall and 17-1 league mark the previous season, as the Blue Devils advanced to the NCAA Elite Eight for the fourth straight year and won the ACC Championship.

Off season

Departures
 Allison Vernerey, a senior with the 2012–13 team, graduated.
 Sierra Moore, a freshman with the 2012–13 team, decided to transfer to Penn State.

Incoming signees
 Kianna Holland is an incoming freshman from Seneca, South Carolina
 Kendall McCravey-Cooper is an incoming freshman from Carson, California
 Oderah Chidom is an incoming freshman from Oakland, California
 Rebecca Greenwell is an incoming freshman from Owensboro, Kentucky

USA Basketball
During the summer, Duke senior guard Tricia Liston won a gold medal with the USA Women's World University Games Team in Russia.

Liston made a key impact on the team in leading them to a 6-0 record, averaging 8.2 points, 3.0 rebounds and 1.0 assists per game. She posted a tied for team best nine three-pointers made, which also tied for fourth most in the tournament. Liston also hit a team-high 42.9 percent from downtown and registered double-figure scoring in each of her first four games.

Sophomore Alexis Jones also won a gold medal with USA Basketball at the 2013 USA U19 World Championships. Team USA (9-0) held France (7-2) to eight points in the second half en route to a 61-28 victory and the USA’s fifth-straight FIBA U19 World Championship gold medal. The Championships were held in Klaipėda and Panevėžys, Lithuania.

In the nine games, Jones averaged 10.0 points, 4.3 assists, 3.2 rebounds and 1.7 steals, while collecting her third career gold medal with USA Basketball. Jones started each of the nine contests and her 4.3 assists per game average ranked tied for fourth among all teams.

In the USA U19 record book, Jones dished out 29 assists and is tied with Ariel Massengale (2011) for the top spot in that category. She is also No. 2 in free throw percentage (.933).

Season preview
Duke is coming off posting a 33-3 overall and 17-1 league mark last season, as the Blue Devils advanced to the NCAA Elite Eight for the fourth straight year and won the ACC Championship.

Head coach Joanne P. McCallie and the Blue Devils return all five starters in 2013-14, including 93.7 percent of its scoring. Along with returning All-America selections Chelsea Gray and Elizabeth Williams, Duke welcomes back All-ACC performers Tricia Liston and Haley Peters. Freshman All-America and ACC Tournament MVP Alexis Jones is the final returning starter for Duke. A total of 11 letterwinners will return to the squad next season as McCallie enters her seventh season with the Blue Devils.

Duke will get started with its annual Blue/White scrimmage on Sunday, Oct. 27 followed by exhibition contests against Glenville State College (Oct. 30) and Coker College (Nov. 3). The Blue Devils will open the season on Sunday, Nov. 10 on the road against a ranked opponent, California.

Roster

Schedule

|-
!colspan=12 style="background:#00009C; color:#FFFFFF;"| Exhibition

|-
!colspan=12 style="background:#00009C; color:#FFFFFF;"| Non-conference regular season

|-
!colspan=12 style="background:#00009C; color:#FFFFFF;"| ACC Regular Season

|-
!colspan=12 style="background:#00009C; color:#FFFFFF;"| ACC Tournament

|-
!colspan=12 style="background:#00009C; color:#FFFFFF;"| NCAA tournament

Source

Rankings

References

Duke
Duke Blue Devils women's basketball seasons
Duke